Claire Pichet is a French soloist singer and musician.

Biography

Performances 
Summer 78, soundtrack of Good Bye Lenin!
The Dreamlife of Angels, soundtrack.
Rue des Cascades
Le Phare
La Rupture

See also
Yann Tiersen

References

Multimedia
 

French women singers
Living people
Year of birth missing (living people)